The Boa Esperança Hydroelectric Power Station (formerly known as Marshal Castelo Branco Hydroelectric Power Station) is a hydroelectric power station in the city of Guadalupe, Piauí in Brazil. It is located on the Parnaíba River.

See also 

 List of power stations in Brazil

Buildings and structures in Piauí
Hydroelectric power stations in Brazil